The Punilla Department is an administrative division of the province of Córdoba, Argentina. It has over 155,000 inhabitants, with a population density of almost 60 inhabitants/km2.

Settlements
Bialet Massé
Cabalango
Capilla del Monte
Casa Grande
Charbonier
Cosquín
Cuesta Blanca
Estancia Vieja
Huerta Grande
La Cumbre
La Falda
Los Cocos
Mayu Sumaj
San Antonio de Arredondo
San Esteban
San Roque
Santa María
Tala Huasi
Tanti
Valle Hermoso
Villa Carlos Paz
Villa Flor Serrana
Villa Giardino
Villa Parque Siquiman
Villa Santa Cruz del Lago
Villa Icho Cruz

See also

 Punilla Valley
 Cerro Uritorco

External links
 This is Punilla website
 Punilla Valley website

References
 

Departments of Córdoba Province, Argentina